Jean-Philippe Lecat (29 July 1935 – 26 March 2011) was a French politician. He graduated from the École nationale d'administration in 1963.
Between 1968 and 1978, he was a member of the Union of Democrats for the Republic and between 1978 and 1981, he was a member of the Rally for the Republic.

Between 1972 and 1973, he was the spokesman of the French government. From 1973 until 1974, he was Minister of Information. Finally, he was between 1978 and 1981, Minister of Culture.

References

1935 births
2011 deaths
Sciences Po alumni
École nationale d'administration alumni
Government spokespersons of France
French Ministers of Culture
Ministers of Information of France
Politicians from Dijon